Diazanaphthalenes are a class of aromatic heterocyclic chemical compounds that have the formula C8H6N2. They consist of a naphthalene double ring in which two of the carbon atoms have been replaced with nitrogen atoms. There are ten positional isomers, which differ by the locations of the nitrogen atoms.

The group consist of two subgroups:
four benzodiazines with both N atoms in one ring: cinnoline, quinazoline, quinoxaline, and phthalazine
six naphthyridines with one N atom in each ring

Isomers

References